Beffe is a village of Wallonia and a district of the municipality of Rendeux, located in the province of Luxembourg, Belgium.

The Ourthe river flows alongside Beffe.

References 
  Official website Rendeux

Former municipalities of Luxembourg (Belgium)
Rendeux